The Men's Super-G in the 2019 FIS Alpine Skiing World Cup involved seven events. Italian skier Dominik Paris seized the lead in the discipline from Vincent Kriechmayr of Austria by winning the next-to-last Super-G of the season in Kvitfjell, then  won the crystal globe for the season by also winning the final in Soldeu, Andorra.

The season was interrupted by the 2019 World Ski Championships, which were held from 4–17 February in Åre, Sweden. The men's Super-G was held on 6 February . . . and was also won by Paris.

Standings

DNF = Did Not Finish
DNS = Did Not Start

See also
 2019 Alpine Skiing World Cup – Men's summary rankings
 2019 Alpine Skiing World Cup – Men's Overall
 2019 Alpine Skiing World Cup – Men's Downhill
 2019 Alpine Skiing World Cup – Men's Giant Slalom
 2019 Alpine Skiing World Cup – Men's Slalom
 2019 Alpine Skiing World Cup – Men's Combined
 World Cup scoring system

References

External links
 Alpine Skiing at FIS website

Men's Super-G
FIS Alpine Ski World Cup men's Super-G discipline titles